Cymbiola scottjordani is a species of sea snail, a marine gastropod mollusk in the family Volutidae, the volutes.

Description

Original Description
      Poppe G.T. & Tagaro S. (2005) A new Cymbiola (Volutidae, Gastropoda) from the Arafura Sea. Visaya 1(5): 136–138. [November 2005]

Distribution

References

Volutidae
Gastropods described in 2005